Joe McLeland (born July 27, 1946) is a former Republican member of the Kansas House of Representatives, representing the 94th district.  He served from 2001 to 2013. In 2010, the Kansas Chapter of Americans for Prosperity gave him a freedom index score of 72%.  In 2010, it gave him a 100% evaluation on conservative issues.

McLeland, who has his BS in Mathematics from Fort Hays State University, has worked as a computer network analyst.

He has been involved with the Catholic Family Federal Credit Union, Family Consultation Service, Kansas Research and Education Network, and the Knights of Columbus Council 4118.

Committee membership
 Appropriations
 Higher Education
 Education Budget (Chair)
 Joint Committee on Information Technology (Chair)

Major donors
The top 5 donors to McLeland's 2008 campaign:
1. Koch Industries 	$800
2. Prairie Band Potawatomi Nation 	$750 	
3. Kansas Medical Society 	$500 	
4. Kansas Contractors Assoc 	$500 	
5. Kansas Optometric Assoc 	$500

References

External links
Official Website
Kansas Legislature - Joe McLeland
Project Vote Smart profile
Kansas Votes profile
Campaign contributions: 2000, 2002, 2004, 2006, 2008
Ballotpedia

Republican Party members of the Kansas House of Representatives
Living people
Fort Hays State University alumni
1946 births
21st-century American politicians